Laoshan District is an urban district (区) of Qingdao, Shandong. It is home to Mount Lao, which gave the district its name.

Geography
Laoshan District is located in the south of the Shandong Peninsula, facing the Yellow Sea in the east and south. The mountain ranges of Laoshan cover most of the eastern part of the district.

The district belongs to north temperature zone, with a monsoon-influenced temperate climate. There is neither intense heat in summer nor severe cold in winter. Most of the district is highland with the average altitude of 55m and surface water of 3m. There is abundant high quality ground water. In fact, Laoshan mineral water is renowned and sold China-wide. Natural resources are abundant, with granite being the prevalent mineral in the area.

Climate

Administrative divisions
As 2012, this district is divided to 4 subdistricts.
Subdistricts

Economy
Laoshan District is home to several Hi-tech industries, tourism and a large service-based industry. In terms of Hi-Tech, the focus is laid on IT, Software, Marine Biological Pharmacy and new materials. Emphasis has been put on sustainable development and green technology, taking advantage of the still-intact mountain forests and the seaside.
The Qingdao International Convention And Exhibition Center (QICC) with an area of 250,000 m2 is currently remains the largest venue for exhibition and convention purposes in Shandong province. It was put into use in April, 2001 and ever since has marked a rapid development phase of Qingdao exhibition and convention economy.

Tourism
Tourism is also essential to the district, with a wide variety of recreational, ecological, seaside sight-seeing tourism facilities including the Polar Ocean World and Shilaoren Sightseeing Garden. The district is home to several well-known festivals, including the Qingdao International Beer Festival, Laoshan Tea Festival and Laoshan Tourism Culture Festival, all of which attract visitor from China as well as abroad. The main tourist attraction within the district is Mount Lao itself, which is a 5A tourist destination. with about 176,000 tourists visiting during the 2012 Golden Week. Other tourist destinations include the Qingdao Museum, Haier Museum, Qingdao Grand Theatre and the Beach at Old Stone Man.

Laoshan tea
Laoshan is well known for its famous green tea. It has a unique character gained as a result of being grown at a higher latitude than any other tea within China. The high latitude makes it all the more difficult for the tea plants to grow which gives the tea a full and complex taste.

Education
Laoshan District is home to over 65 schools and institutions of higher education. It is host to three major universities, most notably the main campus of both the  Ocean University of China  and the Qingdao University of Science and Technology, as well as a branch campus of Qingdao University.

Notable secondary and international schools include Qingdao No.2 Middle School, Qingdao Amerasia International School, Overseas Chinese School, International School of Qingdao, and Qingdao Senior Vocational School.

References

External links
 People's Government of Laoshan District, Qingdao City website.

Geography of Qingdao
County-level divisions of Shandong
Districts of China